Chikkupadhyaya was born (around 1640 AD) to RangAcharya and NachiyAramma in TerakanAmbi in Mysore district of Karnataka. His name at birth was Lakshmipathi. He was the elder twin brother of Devaraja. He belonged to a family of Vedic scholars and poets. He traces his lineage to Sri Allaalanatha (Kannada form of the name Arulaala naatha which denotes Kanchi Varadaraja - as described in one of the Hoysala inscriptions,) and the family deity being Kanchi Varadaraja.

He later moved to and settled in Melkote in Mandya district. He belonged to Shatamarshana (Purukuthsa, or Vishnu-vruddha) lineage of Hebbar Srivaishnava community. Nathamuni, Aalavandaar (Yaamunachaarya), Periya Thirumalai nambi and Bhagavadh Raamanuja's mother all belonged to Shatamarshana lineage. Chikkupadhyaya was a disciple of Sri Kadambi Singaracharya.

The title of Chikkupadhyaya was conferred on Lakshmipathi by Sri Chikka Devaraja Wodeyar for whom he acted as minister and teacher. 'ChikkupAdhyAya' in Kannada means teacher of Sri Chikka Devaraja Wodeyar.

He could be the most prolific writer of Kannada literature. He has more than 30 literary works to his credit. His best known works are Vishnu Purana (1691), Kamalachala Mahatmya (1681), Hastigiri Mahatmya (1679), Rukmangada Charite (1681), Satvikabrahma-Vidya-Vilasa on Visishtadvaita philosophy, and Yadugiri Mahatmya in praise of Kadambi Srirangacharya 
His other well-known works are Divya Suri Charitre, a history of the twelve Alvar saints; Artha Panchaka ("Five truths"), on saint Pillai Lokacharya; a commentary on Tiruvayimozhi of mystic-saint Nammalvar; and a collection of seventy songs called Shringarada Hadugalu in praise of his patron Chikka Devaraja (pen-name "Chikkadevaraja").[89]

His works are 

 aksharamAlika sAngathya 
 Amaruka shathaka 
 kamalAchala mahAthmya 
 kAmandaka teekay 
 Chikkadevraja shtungAra padagalu 
 chithra shathaka sAngathya 
 ThiruvAymozhi teekay 
 divya sUri charithe 
 Neethi shathakada sAngathya 
 paschima ranga mahAthmya 
 purusha virahada sAngathya 
 Yadugiri sAngathya 
 yAdava giri mahAthmya 
 rangadhAma sthuthi sAngathya 
 paschima ranga sAngathya 
 rangaswamiya sUthra udAharaNe 
 rukmangadacharithe 
 Vishnu PurANa 
 Vishnu PurANa gadya 
 Venkatagiri mahAthmya 
 VaidyAmritha teelay 
 shuka sapthathi 
 ShrungAra shathakada sAngathya 
 ALavndhAr sthOthra teeku 
 Bhagavadgeetha teeku 
 Hasthigiri mahAthmya 
 sAthvika brahma vidya vilAsa 
 mukunda mAla teeku 
 sri ranganAtha paduka sahasra teeku 
 Padma purANa samhitha teeku 
 prapannAmritha padya rUpa

See also
Karnataka Literature

References

 History of Mysore, 1399-1799 AD, C. Hayavadana Rao, Corresponding Member, INDIAN HISTORICAL RECORDS COMMISSION, 1943, New Delhi.
 Sri Varadarajaswami Temple, Kanchi: A Study of Its History, Art and Architecture - K.V. Raman, 1975, New Delhi.
 Pranesh, Meera Rajaram (2003), Musical Composers during Wodeyar Dynasty (1638-1947 AD), Vee Emm Publications, Bangalore EBK 94056.
 Mysore Gazeteers Volume II
 Bhagavadgeetha teeku, 2011, Academy of Sanskrit Research, Melukote.

External links
 Medieval Indian Literature: An Anthology: Volume 1,  K. Ayyappapanicker, Sahitya Akademi - Literary Collections - 1997
 History of Kannada Literature: Readership Lectures - Ramanujapuram Narasimhacharya, Published 1988
 Encyclopaedia of Indian literature - Vol. 1, Sahitya Akademi, Published 1987
 http://www.ramanuja.org/new/tp96/andal_in_andhra_and_k.txt (Srivaishnava bhakthi group)
 https://web.archive.org/web/20061130032824/http://www.memo.fr/article.asp?ID=THE_ART_046 (in French)

Kannada poets
17th-century Indian poets
Writers from Mysore
Indian male poets
17th-century male writers